Freud and Philosophy: An Essay on Interpretation is a 1965 book about Sigmund Freud, the founder of psychoanalysis, written by the French philosopher Paul Ricœur. In Freud and Philosophy, Ricœur interprets Freud's work in terms of hermeneutics, a theory that governs the interpretation of a particular text, and phenomenology, a school of philosophy founded by Edmund Husserl. Ricœur addresses questions such as the nature of interpretation in psychoanalysis, the understanding of human nature and the relationship between Freud's interpretation of culture amongst other interpretations. The book was first published in France by Éditions du Seuil, and in the United States by Yale University Press.

Ricœur explores what he considers a tension in Freud's work between an emphasis on "energetics", which explains psychological phenomena in terms of quantities of energy, and an emphasis on hermeneutics. He compares Freud to the philosophers Karl Marx and Friedrich Nietzsche describing the trio as a "school of suspicion" and explores similarities and differences between psychoanalysis and phenomenology. He also compares Freud's ideas to those of the philosopher Georg Wilhelm Friedrich Hegel and further develops his ideas about symbols explored in an earlier work, The Symbolism of Evil (1960). In response to criticism of the scientific status of psychoanalysis by philosophers such as Ernest Nagel, Ricœur argues that psychoanalysis should be understood not as an observational science, but as an "interpretation" that resembles history rather than psychology. He criticizes psychoanalysts who fail to adopt this as their response to arguments that psychoanalysis is unscientific.

One of Ricœur's most noted works, Freud and Philosophy has been compared to the philosopher Herbert Marcuse's Eros and Civilization (1955), the classicist Norman O. Brown's Life Against Death (1959), the sociologist Philip Rieff's Freud: The Mind of the Moralist (1959), and the philosopher Jürgen Habermas's Knowledge and Human Interests (1968). Commentators have praised Ricœur's discussion of Freud's theories, his exploration of usually neglected aspects of Freud's work, his comparison of Freud to Hegel, Marx and Nietzsche and his discussion of phenomenology. However, Freud and Philosophy became controversial. The work angered the psychoanalyst Jacques Lacan, who accused Ricœur of borrowing his ideas without attribution; although some scholars have rejected the accusation.  Freud and Philosophy received positive reviews upon the publication of its English translation in 1970. The book was described as one of the most important discussions of psychoanalysis, and Ricœur was praised for his discussion of symbols. He was also credited with convincingly criticizing Freud's views on both symbols and religion generally. However, some critics have argued that Ricœur's views imply the impossibility of scientifically evaluating psychoanalysis.

Summary

Preface
Ricœur explains that his subject is Sigmund Freud, the founder of psychoanalysis, rather than psychoanalysis itself, and that he therefore avoids discussing psychoanalytic literature subsequent to Freud and dissident figures such as the psychiatrist Carl Jung. He stresses that Freud and Philosophy is a work of philosophy and not a work of psychology, and compares his enterprise to those of philosophers such as Roland Dalbiez in Psychoanalytical Method and the Doctrine of Freud (1936) and Herbert Marcuse in Eros and Civilization (1955), as well as to those of the sociologist Philip Rieff in Freud: The Mind of the Moralist (1959) and the psychoanalyst John Flügel in Man, Morals and Society (1945). Like Marcuse, Rieff, and Flügel, he considers psychoanalysis an "interpretation of culture", but unlike them his principal concern is the "structure of Freudian discourse".

He identifies his main purposes as explaining the nature and purpose of interpretation in psychoanalysis, showing to what understanding of human nature psychoanalytic interpretation leads, and exploring whether or how Freud's interpretation of culture is compatible with other interpretations. He notes that by discussing these questions he further explores unresolved issues related to symbols raised in his earlier work The Symbolism of Evil.

Book I: Problematic: The Placing of Freud
Ricœur relates his discussion of Freud to the emphasis on the importance of language shared by philosophers such as Ludwig Wittgenstein and Martin Heidegger, schools of philosophy, such as phenomenology, a movement founded by Edmund Husserl, and English linguistic philosophy—as well as disciplines such as New Testament exegesis, comparative religion, anthropology, and psychoanalysis. Ricœur argues that there is a need for a "comprehensive philosophy of language" to explain its diverse purposes, and that psychoanalysts should participate in discussion of language.

He maintains that one of Freud's objectives was "a reinterpretation of all psychical productions pertaining to culture, from dreams, through art and morality, to religion". Discussing Freud's theory of dreams, he writes that Freud used dreams as a model for all disguised expressions of human desire. He argues that psychoanalysis is concerned not with desires themselves but rather the language in which they are conveyed, that it involves a "semantics of desire", and that psychoanalytic concepts such as repression and cathexis express dynamics or "energetics" that are "articulated only in a semantics". He writes that Freud's examinations of dreams and related phenomena such as humor, mythology, and religion, shows that they are meaningful and concern the way in which desires "achieve speech". He concludes that psychoanalysis offers a new approach to speech. In Ricœur's view, Freud's work suggests that language resembles dreams, in the sense that it "means something other than what it says" and expresses "double meaning". According to Ricœur, dreams and phenomena comparable to them, including both insanity and human culture in general, involve "significations where another meaning is both given and hidden in an immediate meaning", which he equates with the symbol.

Comparing the way in which psychoanalysis addresses "double meaning" to that of the phenomenology of religion, he identifies both similarities and differences between the two approaches. In his view, the primary difference is that phenomena that psychoanalysis views as distorted reflections of basic desires are regarded by the phenomenology of religion as "the revelation of the sacred". The relative merits of these views are one of his major concerns. He argues that psychoanalysis is concerned with "the hermeneutic field", which concerns double meanings and the confrontation between different forms of interpretation. He defines "hermeneutics" as "the theory of the rules that preside over an exegesis—that is, over the interpretation of a particular text, or of a group of signs that may be viewed as a text", adding that exegesis can be understood to include the interpretation of things analogous to texts. He proposes that "the problem of symbolism" is to a large extent coextensive with that of language.

In Ricœur's view, Freud's work can be compared to that of the philosophers Karl Marx and Friedrich Nietzsche. He refers to the trio as masters of the "school of suspicion", arguing that despite their differences, the apparent incompatibility of their ideas, and despite caricatures or misunderstandings of their conclusions, they all view consciousness primarily as false consciousness, seeking to explain its process and provide a means of deciphering it, with the objective of extending consciousness. He views all of them as being fundamentally opposed to the "phenomenology of the sacred" and to "hermeneutics understood as the recollection of meaning and as the reminiscence of being".

Book II: Analytic: Reading of Freud
Ricœur explains that in the second section of the book he discusses psychoanalysis in relation to other perspectives primarily to show how it differs from or is opposed to them. He argues that it can be understood as both an "energetics", in that it entails "an explanation of psychical phenomena through conflicts of forces", and a "hermeneutics", in that it entails an "exegesis of apparent meaning through a latent meaning". He discusses Freud's theories of the death drive, the defence mechanisms, homosexuality, the id, ego and super-ego, identification, the libido, metapsychology, narcissism, the Oedipus complex, the pleasure principle, the preconscious, the psychic apparatus, psychosexual development, the reality principle, sublimation, the transference, the unconscious, as well as dreamwork, Freud's seduction theory, and the method of free association.

He suggests that in The Interpretation of Dreams (1899), Freud did not succeed in reconciling the "language of meaning" and the "quasi-physical language" implied by different parts of his theory. He notes that for Freud, dreams provide the "ultimate proof" of the existence of the unconscious, since in Freud's view the dreamwork's activity of distortion makes it necessary to attribute to the unconscious both a distinct place in the structure of the mind and its own set of laws. He considers the psychoanalytic concept of the unconscious "totally unphenomenological". He also sees a fundamental contrast between Husserl's epoché, which involves a "reduction to consciousness", and the procedures of psychoanalysis, which involve a "reduction of consciousness". He argues that the contrast is the result of Freud's emphasis on instinct, which displaces an emphasis on the role of the subject and the object in consciousness, and observes that Freud realized that by using the concept of instinct to "relate empirical facts", he had moved from description to systematization, and that this involved the use of postulates. He elaborates that Freud's postulates included those concerned with the operation of the psychic apparatus, which in Freud's view was regulated by qualities of "pleasure-unpleasure", which in turn depended on "the amounts of stimulus ... affecting mental life".

Observing that, for Freud, the object of instincts must be understood in terms of their aim and not the reverse, he adds that the object may be either something external to a person or part of his or her own body. He credits Freud with making these discoveries in Three Essays on the Theory of Sexuality (1905). He provides examples of how Freud attempted to explain the process by which instincts change their objects in his theories of narcissism and identification, observing that, for Freud, explaining narcissism meant showing that "not only is the object a function of the aim of an instinct, but the ego itself is an aim of instinct". He writes that, in Freud's view, narcissism has to be understood through its secondary expressions, such as the perversion "in which one's own body is treated as an object of love", and that the theory of narcissism helped Freud to show that displacement of narcissism is the basis of "the formation of ideals" and thus has implications for the theory of identification. He notes that, for Freud, identification is based in the oral stage of development and modeled after the act of devouring. He argues that it was important for Freud that he decide whether it involves a desire to possess something or a desire to be like something, since only the former could be traced to oral origins.

Following earlier commentary, Ricœur maintains that Freud uses different sets of terms, including an "observational" set concerned with observable phenomena and a "theoretical" set concerned with phenomena that cannot be observed, including various hypothesized forces. He maintains that the conflict between hermeneutics and an incompatible discourse of "economics", involving quantities of energy, persisted in Freud's work after The Interpretation of Dreams, and concludes that in it, "the language of force can never be overcome by the language of meaning". According to Ricœur, psychoanalytic claims about religion are shaped by both the "topographic-economic model" of Freudian metapsychology and by the example of dreams. He argues that aspects of Freud's views on religion, such as his "radical questioning" of it, merit the consideration of both religious believers and non-believers, despite potential misunderstandings by both groups. He also proposes that psychoanalysis can co-exist with "purified" religious faith. However, he questions Freud's analogy between religion and neurosis, as well as the accuracy of some of his claims about the history of religion. Freud's hypothesis of the death instinct, put forward in Beyond the Pleasure Principle (1920), is criticized by Ricœur, who describes it as speculative and as resting on a limited factual basis. He draws connections between Freud's ideas about the death instinct and his views about the structure of the mind as presented in The Ego and the Id (1923).

Book III: Dialectic: A Philosophical Interpretation of Freud
Ricœur explains that the third section of the book is concerned with criticism of Freud's ideas. He summarizes his approach as involving first examining the validity of psychoanalysis from the standpoint of epistemology, then exploring its concepts through elaborating an "archaeology of the subject". He adds that he then integrates this "archaeology" with a "teleology" in a way that suggests the possibility of interrelating these "opposed hermeneutics".

He compares psychoanalysis to both scientific psychology and phenomenology, arguing that it cannot be made part of a "general psychology". He writes that most philosophers who have discussed psychoanalysis have concluded that it fails to satisfy the basic requirements of a scientific theory. He credits Ernest Nagel with presenting the strongest such argument, summarizing it as follows. It is questionable whether psychoanalysis is subject to empirical verification, since some its concepts are so vague and metaphorical, and have such an unclear relevance to behavior, that it appears impossible to either deduce specific conclusions from them or explain how psychoanalysis itself could be refuted. Furthermore, there is no way of showing that psychoanalytic interpretations are valid because psychoanalytic data cannot be separated from the relationship of a given analyst to his or her patients and the suspicion that interpretations are forced upon the data by analysts is unavoidable given the lack of comparative procedures and statistical investigation. Between them, these problems make it impossible for independent inquirers to obtain the same data under carefully standardized circumstances or for psychoanalysts to establish objective procedures to decide which conflicting interpretations might be correct. Claims made by psychoanalysts about the effectiveness of treatment are unavailing, since the percentages of improvement cannot be strictly established or defined by appropriate studies, making it impossible to compare the effectiveness of psychoanalysis to other methods of treatment.

In Ricœur's view, such arguments are convincing so long as psychoanalysis is considered an observational science. He argues that psychoanalysts should, but have not, respond by presenting psychoanalysis as an "interpretation" that resembles history rather than psychology. He argues that while some psychoanalysts have tried to reformulate psychoanalysis so that it meets scientific criteria acceptable to psychologists, aspects of Freudian theory make this difficult. He refers to the attempt to assimilate psychoanalysis to observational psychology as the "operational" reformulation of psychoanalysis. He writes that such efforts at operationalization have not satisfied psychologists. He nevertheless argues that they are legitimate, writing that it is desirable for psychoanalysis to be evaluated by psychology and that attempts should be made to validate or invalidate its results. However, he emphasizes that such reformulation of psychoanalysis is "a second operation with respect to the experience on the basis of which the Freudian concepts have arisen" and as such can only deal with results that are "detached from the analytic experience".

Emphasizing the importance of the difference between the concepts of psychoanalysis and those of behavioral psychology, Ricœur endorses the philosopher Stephen Toulmin's argument that an explanation of human behavior in terms of motives is different in kind from an explanation of human behavior in terms of causes, and that psychoanalysis deals with motives rather than causes. He maintains that because psychoanalysis is concerned with motive concepts, there is a clear distinction between it and observational science. Criticizing the idea that psychoanalysis resembles an experimental science, he emphasizes, following the work of Jacques Lacan, that an analysis is based on verbal interactions between a psychoanalyst and a patient and that it reveals "another language, dissociated from common language, and which presents itself to be deciphered through its meaningful effects" such as symptoms and dreams. He maintains that psychoanalytic theory is thus concerned with "analytic experience, insofar as the latter operates in the field of speech". He critiques Freud's theories concerning sublimation, arguing that they suffer from multiple problems and that sublimation is an "empty concept", as well as his views on language. He also discusses the relationship between Freud's ideas and those of the philosopher Georg Wilhelm Friedrich Hegel, comparing the role that desire plays in both men's work.

Background and publication history
According to Ricœur, Freud and Philosophy originated in the Terry Lectures given at Yale University in 1961, and was also developed in lectures given at the University of Louvain in 1962. The book was first published in French in May 1965 by Éditions du Seuil, as part of the series L'Ordre philosophique (The Philosophic Order). In 1970, an English translation by Denis Savage was published in hardcover by Yale University Press. A paperback edition followed in 1977.

Reception
Freud and Philosophy has become a well-known study of Freud, influential in both philosophy and psychoanalysis. Together with Fallible Man and The Symbolism of Evil, both published in 1960, and The Conflict of Interpretations (1969), it is considered one of Ricœur's most important works. Commentators have evaluated it from a variety of philosophical perspectives, offering a mixture of praise and criticism for the work. Freud and Philosophy has been compared to Eros and Civilization, as well as to Freud: The Mind of the Moralist, and the philosopher Jürgen Habermas's Knowledge and Human Interests (1968) and the classicist Norman O. Brown's Life Against Death (1959). The philosopher Jeffrey Abramson, who praised Ricœur's discussions of narcissism and sublimation, maintained that these works jointly placed Freud at the center of moral and philosophical inquiry. Freud and Philosophy has also been praised by the philosophers Don Ihde, who nevertheless found its approach to interpretation limited by its focus on the ideas of symbol and double meaning, Richard Kearney, and Douglas Kellner. Kearney credited Ricœur with demonstrating that the symbolic imagination is linguistic; he has also suggested that Ricœur was engaged in a form of eschatology. Kellner credited Ricœur with demonstrating the importance of psychoanalysis for "increasing understanding of human nature and contributing to the process of self-formation". He believed Ricœur made better use of some Freudian ideas than did Marcuse.

The psychoanalysts R. D. Chessick, Joel Kovel, and Joel Whitebook, have praised Freud and Philosophy. Chessick called the book a "classic" and "one of the best philosophical works on Freud", crediting Ricœur with providing a "thorough and scholarly" discussion of Freud, and with presenting "brilliant ideas and conceptions". He praised Ricœur's treatment of Freud's view of religion. He compared the structure of Freud and Philosophy to that of the philosopher Immanuel Kant's Critique of Pure Reason (1781), and found its "methodology and prose" reminiscent of Hegel. However, he described the work as poorly written and sometimes unintelligible. He also faulted Ricœur for over-emphasizing symbols and for his treatment of the transference and the relationship of psychoanalysis to science. He suggested that Ricœur borrowed from Lacan, finding this apparent in Ricœur's understanding of the "semantics of desire". Kovel described Freud and Philosophy as an important demonstration that Freud was a post-Hegelian thinker. Whitebook argued that Freud and Philosophy was "unsurpassed" and disproved the view that clinical experience is necessary for understanding psychoanalytic theory.

The psychologists Paul Vitz and Malcolm Macmillan have both praised Ricœur's discussion of Freud's theories about the development of the ego. Macmillan credited Ricœur with recognizing that Freud saw a close connection between the mental structures he outlined in The Ego and the Id and the instinctual theory he put forward in Beyond the Pleasure Principle. He endorsed Ricœur's criticism of the concept of sublimation and his questioning of the idea that identification has an oral origin. Ricœur's hermeneutic approach to psychoanalysis has been discussed by the historians Peter Gay and Roger Smith. Gay described Freud and Philosophy as a "highly disciplined study", but noted his disagreement with the work. Smith credited Ricœur with demonstrating the merits of a hermeneutic approach to Freud. The pastoral counselor Kirk A. Bingaman praised Ricœur's discussion of hermeneutics, crediting him with demonstrating that "a Freudian hermeneutic" can both challenge and "purify and strengthen" religious faith.

However, Freud and Philosophy has received criticism from psychologists such as Hans Eysenck, Glenn Wilson, and Paul Kline, who have attributed to Ricœur the view that psychoanalysis either cannot or should not be evaluated in terms of experimental evidence. Eysenck and Wilson described Freud and Philosophy as a good example of a defense of psychoanalysis against the claim that it should be so evaluated. They argued that Ricœur espoused a form of "extreme subjectivism" which implies that psychoanalytic theories cannot be tested empirically or shown to be mistaken. They suggested that Freud would have rejected Ricœur's conclusions and that few psychologists or psychoanalysts would accept them. They also argued that if Ricœur's conclusions were to be accepted, this would further undermine psychoanalysis. Kline wrote that Ricœur might be correct that psychoanalysis cannot be dealt with through experiments based on quantifiable evidence, but argued that if he is, this shows that psychoanalytic theory is not scientific. The sociologist John Thompson considered Ricœur's views about the role of language and meaning in psychoanalysis similar to those of Lacan. While Thompson praised Freud and Philosophy, he believed that Ricœur failed to resolve the "question of the scientific status of psychoanalysis" in the work. He and Ricœur both noted that Ricœur took a different approach to the issue in his essay "The question of proof in Freud's psychoanalytic writings", which was published in Hermeneutics and the Human Sciences (1981).

The philosopher Richard J. Bernstein credited Ricœur with showing that there was always a tension in Freud's thinking between an emphasis on "energetics" and an emphasis on "hermeneutics", and with using his discussion of Hegel to explain aspects of Freud's work. However, he noted that Ricœur presented only one possible philosophical interpretation of Freud, and suggested that the section of Freud and Philosophy in which he did so was the weakest part of the book. He argued that Ricœur's interpretation of Freud suffered from "tensions and unresolved issues". He also remained unconvinced by Ricœur's critique of Freud's views on religion. Ricœur has also been criticized by the philosophers Ronald de Sousa, Geoff Waite, and Todd Dufresne. De Sousa maintained that Ricœur was one of several commentators on Freud to have incorrectly argued that Freud, by basing the method of psychoanalysis on an extension of the principle of determinism from the physical to the mental realm, confused determinism and meaningfulness. Waite described Ricœur's claim that Freud, Marx, and Nietzsche form a "school of suspicion" as "famous" but misleading. Dufresne considered Ricœur's interpretation of Freud evenhanded and in some ways superior to Lacan's. He credited Ricœur with discussing important points that are rarely addressed, and complimented his interpretation of the concept of the death drive. However, he concluded that Ricœur's attempt to "oppose and then synthesize" Freud and Hegel was already dated when Freud and Philosophy was published. He noted that thinkers such Marcuse, Lacan, Gilles Deleuze, Jacques Derrida, and Judith Butler have produced interpretations of Beyond the Pleasure Principle irreconcilable with Ricœur's.

The philosopher Adolf Grünbaum has discussed Freud and Philosophy in works such as The Foundations of Psychoanalysis (1984) and Validation in the Clinical Theory of Psychoanalysis (1993). In The Foundations of Psychoanalysis, he criticized Ricœur's hermeneutic interpretation of Freud, arguing that Ricœur incorrectly limited the relevance of psychoanalytic theory to verbal statements made during analytic therapy. He accused Ricœur of wanting to protect his hermeneutic understanding of psychoanalysis from scientific examination and criticism, and maintained that Ricœur's arguments rested on an untenable dichotomy between theory and observation and that he took a reductive form of behaviorism as his model of scientific psychology. He argued that Ricœur's view that psychoanalysis provides a "semantics of desire" mistakenly equates symptoms with linguistic representations of their causes, and accused Ricœur of endorsing Lacan's "obfuscating" view that a symptom resembles "a language whose speech must be realized". However, Grünbaum gave Ricœur credit for later, in Hermeneutics and the Human Sciences, reassessing his views by abandoning the dichotomy between reasons and causes.

Grünbaum's criticisms of Ricœur have been endorsed, in whole or in part, by the psychologist Robert R. Holt, the psychoanalyst Jonathan Lear, the historian Paul Robinson, and the critic Frederick Crews. Holt dismissed Freud and Philosophy, arguing that it was only superficially impressive, that parts of it were unreadable, and that Ricœur used vague or inappropriately metaphorical language. He also maintained that Ricœur's view that psychoanalysis is not a science depended on unoriginal arguments. Though he noted that Ricœur's views were supported by some psychoanalysts, he argued that if Ricœur's view that psychoanalysis does not have to make predictions and is not subject to "substantial constraints" were correct, it would mean the end of psychoanalysis. Lear criticized Freud and Philosophy, blaming it, along with Knowledge and Human Interests, for convincing some psychoanalysts that reasons cannot be causes. Robinson described Freud and Philosophy as a classic portrayal of Freud as a hermeneutician and a philosopher similar to Nietzsche. He compared Ricœur's views to those of Derrida. Although he believed that there was some truth to them, he argued that Ricœur's arguments obscured Freud's identification with the scientific tradition. He credited Grünbaum with showing that Ricœur was misguided in this respect. Crews criticized Ricœur for helping to inspire unscientific defenses of Freud and psychoanalysis and for misunderstanding Freud. The philosopher Philippe Lacour suggested that the debate between Grünbaum and Ricœur suffered from the fact that, while Grünbaum read and responded to Ricœur's writings, it was unclear whether Ricœur paid any attention to Grünbaum.

According to the historian and psychoanalyst Élisabeth Roudinesco, Ricœur first presented the interpretation of Freud later expounded in Freud and Philosophy at a colloquium held in France in 1960. Roudinesco maintains that Freud and Philosophy combines hermeneutics with a philosophy inspired by "post-Hegelian phenomenology", draws on Christian traditions and language, and conflicted with the structuralism of the early 1960s. According to Roudinesco, Freud and Philosophy was well received in France because it was the first book of its kind, but also criticized because phenomenology had become unfashionable by the time it was published in May 1965.

Freud and Philosophy angered Lacan, who had expected the book to praise him. It has been suggested that Lacan was angered by Freud and Philosophy because he considered himself alone to be the "authentic French interpreter of Freud". Lacan spread the rumor, which convinced Lacan's followers, that Ricœur had borrowed his ideas without attribution. Some psychoanalysts influenced by Lacan argued that since Ricœur was not a psychoanalyst and had never been psychoanalyzed he was incompetent to write about Freud. In Critique, the psychoanalyst Jean-Paul Valabrega accused Ricœur of having drawn on Lacan's ideas despite claiming to be original. At the request of the philosopher Michel Foucault, Critique published a reply by Ricœur, in which he denied the accusation and explained that he had completed the outline of his interpretation of Freud before having read Lacan. Roudinesco dismisses the charge that Ricœur had borrowed Lacan's ideas, arguing that he could not have done so given his failure to understand them.

Roudinesco states that Freud and Philosophy received a negative review in Les Temps modernes from Michel Tort, who argued that the book was obscurantist and reactionary, that Ricœur's Christian and phenomenological approach to understanding Freud's texts was unhelpful and obsolete, and that Lacan's approach to psychoanalysis was superior to that of Ricœur. Vinicio Busacchi wrote that Tort's discussion of Freud and Philosophy was "fallacious and calumnious" and that the accusation of plagiarism against Ricœur was false.

Others who responded to the book in France include the philosopher Louis Althusser's students, whose view of the work was negative, as well as Deleuze and Guattari; Ricœur's arguments about the death instinct influenced their joint work Anti-Oedipus (1972). However, they were critical of Ricœur's interpretation of Freud's theory of culture. After Ricœur's death in 2005, the philosopher Jonathan Rée wrote that Freud and Philosophy was a "powerful" book that had been "scandalously neglected in France".

Freud and Philosophy received positive reviews in academic journals written in English. These reviews include those by the psychiatrist Peter H. Knapp in The American Journal of Psychiatry, the psychoanalyst Gerald J. Gargiulo in The Psychoanalytic Review, the philosopher Eliseo Vivas in the Journal of Value Inquiry, the philosopher John W. Slaughter in the International Journal for Philosophy of Religion, the psychiatrist Simon A. Grolnick in The Psychoanalytic Quarterly, the psychiatrist Norman Reider in the Journal of the History of the Behavioral Sciences, Ihde in the International Philosophical Quarterly, the psychiatrist Eliot Slater in the British Journal of Psychiatry, the philosopher George J. Stack in The Modern Schoolman, and the theologian Walter James Lowe in Religious Studies Review. However, the book received a negative review from the philosopher John M. Hems in Philosophy and Phenomenological Research.

Knapp described the book as "thoughtful, searching, and comprehensive". He wrote that Ricœur had broad knowledge of both philosophy and psychoanalysis. He credited him with carefully distinguishing between different aspects of Freud's work and convincingly criticizing Freud's hypotheses about language and views about religion. He also believed that he revealed Freud's "lack of a broad view of symbolic functioning", exposed confusions in Freud's thought, such as that between "force" as a metaphorical term and "force" as a reference to observable phenomena, and showed that psychoanalysis resembles historical science and phenomenology rather than science as understood by positivism. He praised his discussion of Toulmin. However, he suggested that integrating Freud's views about meaning with Freud's ideas about "drive energy" would "require a more comprehensive psychosomatic theory of emotion" than that provided by Ricœur, and that Freud and Philosophy was sometimes confused and presented debatable conclusions. He compared the book to Brown's Life Against Death. Gargiulo described the book as "a provocative philosophical enterprise and a masterful reading of Freud" and "a text of extraordinary complexity and sensitivity". He compared Ricœur's work to that of Rieff, and credited him with showing that "desire has a semantics" and that psychoanalysis "cannot be verified as in physical and experimental sciences". He praised his discussions of sublimation and symbols. However, he criticized Ricœur's discussion of the reality principle.

Vivas described the book as the most thorough study of Freudian theory that he was aware of. He considered it similar, but also superior to, Freud: The Mind of the Moralist. He praised Ricœur's discussion of Freud's views on religion, crediting him with convincingly criticizing and correcting them. However, while finding Ricœur's views on religion preferable to Freud's, he nevertheless disagreed with them. He also expressed uncertainty about whether Ricœur had resolved the issue of the scientific status of psychoanalysis, and questioned the value of Ricœur's discussion of the reasons for the difficulty of resolving whether the processes postulated by psychoanalysis actually exist. Slaughter suggested that the book might be the best commentary on Freud ever written, maintaining that it not only assisted in the understanding of Freud but had implications for the practice of philosophy. However, he criticized Ricœur's discussion of Freud's views on religion, believing that Ricœur interrupted his discussion of Freud by presenting his personal beliefs.

Grolnick understood the work as "a stage in the development of a comprehensive religious philosophy". He credited Ricœur with placing psychoanalysis in a larger historical and intellectual context and relating it to contemporary cultural trends, showing broad knowledge of philosophy, literature, and religion, and providing a useful discussion of the development of Freud's work. He praised Ricœur's exploration of topics such as narcissism, identification, sublimation, and the reality principle, and believed that he showed the flaws of some of Freud's views on art, culture, and religion. He complimented Ricœur for his comparison of psychoanalysis and phenomenology. However, he wrote that psychoanalysts might disagree with Ricœur's assessment of the scientific status of psychoanalysis, and that some of Ricœur's criticisms of Freud were unoriginal, having been made within psychoanalysis itself. Reider described the work as "one of the most important books on the theory of psychoanalysis in the last two decades". He praised Ricœur's discussion of Freud, crediting him with noting respects in which Freud's views were illogical, inconsistent, or incomplete, especially where religion was concerned. He considered Ricœur's critique of Freud superior to anything written by psychoanalysts. He also praised Ricœur's discussion of "symbols and symbolization" and his criticism of Nagel. However, he wrote that Ricœur's "preoccupation with religion, with the sacred, and his conclusion that psychoanalyis is teleological contain weighty evidence of his acceptance of idealism".

Ihde maintained that the book was primarily about language and hermeneutics and that Ricœur's discussion of Freud was often "tedious". He credited Ricœur with using the Freudian ideas to correct phenomenology. He noted that the book was "Ricœur's most controversial work", and that it was criticized by adherents of phenomenology, who argued that Ricœur ignored the contributions of "phenomenological-existentialist psychologists". He rejected such criticisms. He also argued that despite the charge that Ricœur had borrowed ideas from Lacan, Freud and Philosophy reflected themes, such as the importance of symbols, that Ricœur had explored in earlier works such as The Symbolism of Evil.

Slater considered the book impressive, calling it the first detailed study "by a professional philosopher of the development of Freud's thought and of psychoanalytical theory in all the stages of its growth". He praised Ricœur's discussion of the development of Freud's ideas. However, he found it unclear whether Ricœur "shows successfully on what grounds psychoanalysis could subjected to any criticism whatsoever". He suggested that Ricœur's view of the interactions between psychoanalysts and their patients misleadingly suggested that there is no way for third parties to determine the truth or untruth of the claims made by the analysts about their patients. He believed that this undermined their credibility.

Stack described the book as "illuminating and profound". He credited Ricœur with providing "the most complete philosophical interpretation" of psychoanalysis to date, demonstrating "the incompleteness of Freud's conception of symbols", carefully discussing Freud's view of instinct, convincingly criticizing Freud's theorizing about the death instinct, and usefully comparing "Hegel's phenomenology of desire and Freudian theory". He praised Ricœur's comparison of psychoanalysis and phenomenology, suggesting that he showed that they are ultimately incompatible despite the similarities between them. While he believed that Ricœur's insights undermined Freud's hostility to religion, he questioned Ricœur's attempt to find common ground between Freud and the phenomenology of religion. He was also unconvinced by Ricœur's attempt to demonstrate "an implicit teleology in psychoanalysis".

In Religious Studies Review, Lowe credited Ricœur with providing an interesting perspective on psychoanalysis. He compared Ricœur's views to those of Browning. He praised his comparison of psychoanalysis and phenomenology, crediting him with showing why it is wrong to absorb psychoanalysis into phenomenology or identify the two. He also praised his discussion of Freud's ideas in relation to those of Hegel. He wrote that he had influenced discussions of the relevance of Freud to theology, for example in his description of a teleological aspect to Freudian thought. However, he suggested that Freud and Philosophy contained unusual language. Hems wrote that the book could be seen as either "a work of formidable thoroughness" or one of "irksome prolixity", depending on one's point of view. He questioned whether Ricœur's attempt to reinterpret Freud was successful.

See also
 Freud and His Critics
 Love and Its Place in Nature
 Philosophical Essays on Freud

References

Bibliography
Books

 
 
 
 
 
 
 
 
 
 
 
 
 
 
 
 
 
 
 
 
 
 
 
 
 
 
 
 
 
 
 
 

Journals

 
  
 
  
 
 
 
 
 
 
  
 
 
 
 
 
 
 
 
 

Online articles

External links
Gerald J. Gargiulo's review of Freud and Philosophy

1965 non-fiction books
Books about hermeneutics
Books about religion
Books about Sigmund Freud
Books by Paul Ricœur
Continental philosophy literature
Éditions du Seuil books
French non-fiction books
Works about philosophy of psychology
Yale University Press books